The Life That I Have (sometimes referred to as Yours) is a short poem written by Leo Marks and used as a poem code in the Second World War.

In the war, famous poems were used to encrypt messages. This was, however, found to be insecure because enemy cryptanalysts were able to locate the original from published sources. Marks countered this by using his own written creations. The Life That I Have was an original poem composed on Christmas Eve 1943 and was originally written by Marks in memory of his girlfriend Ruth, who had just died in a plane crash in Canada. On 24 March 1944, the poem was issued by Marks to Violette Szabo, a British agent of Special Operations Executive who was eventually captured, tortured and killed by the Nazis.

It was made famous by its inclusion in the 1958 movie about Szabo, Carve Her Name with Pride, where the poem was said to be the creation of Violette's husband Etienne. (Marks allowed it to be used under the condition that its author not be identified.)

The text of the poem:

In popular culture
Actor Michael Hordern recited the poem and told the story behind it during his 1980 appearance on the BBC Radio 4 series With Great Pleasure.

The poem was recited at Chelsea Clinton's 2010 wedding to Marc Mezvinsky.

Bibliography
  Marks relates his briefing of Violette Szabo prior to her first mission, and his giving the poem to her in Chapter 65 of this book.
  A small 34 page book with the text of the poem, illustrated by his wife.

References

External links 
 Carve Her Name with Pride at the British Film Institute
 

English poems
1943 poems
World War II poems
Special Operations Executive